Lars Høgvold (11 September 1888 – 31 December 1963) was a Norwegian ski jumper. He was awarded the Holmenkollen medal in 1916 and finished 6th at the FIS Nordic World Ski Championships 1926. He was born in Løten and competed for Løiten SF, Furnes SF and Lillehammer SK. He was a board member for 25 years in Lillehammer SK, 4 years in Gudbrandsdal District of Skiing and 10 years in the Norwegian Ski Federation.

References

Holmenkollen medalists - click Holmenkollmedaljen for downloadable pdf file 

1888 births
1963 deaths
People from Løten
Holmenkollen medalists
Norwegian male Nordic combined skiers
Norwegian male ski jumpers
Norwegian sports executives and administrators